Jill M. Siegfried is an American pharmacologist.

A Milwaukee, Wisconsin, native, Siegfried attended Wellesley College, where she received a double degree in German and molecular biology before earning advanced degrees in pharmacology from Yale University. Siegfried completed two years of postdoctoral study at the University of North Carolina, Chapel Hill prior to joining the faculty of University of Pittsburgh. Later, she was named University of Pittsburgh Medical Center (UPMC) Endowed Chair for Lung Cancer Research, a position she left in 2013 to accept an appointment at the University of Minnesota as Frederick and Alice Stark Professor of Pharmacology.

References

Year of birth missing (living people)
Living people
American oncologists
Women oncologists
American pharmacologists
Women pharmacologists
Cancer researchers
University of Pittsburgh faculty
University of Minnesota faculty
Wellesley College alumni
Yale University alumni
Scientists from Milwaukee